The Primera División of the  (Professional Football League), more commonly known as  La Liga Mayor or La Primera, is the top professional football league in El Salvador.

It was established in 1969, and in 2011 had 10 clubs. Initially the league was run as a year-long tournament, but since 1998 there are two tournaments each year, much like in many other football leagues in the Americas.

The Apertura season runs from August to December, while the Clausura season runs from February to July.

Of the 56 teams to have competed in the league, FAS has won the title 19 times,  followed by Alianza and Aguila (16), Firpo and Isidro Metapan (10)

Competition format
La Liga Mayor follows the usual double round-robin format.

During the course of a given season (Apertura or Clausura), each club plays every other club twice, once at home and once away, for a total of 22 games.

Teams receive three points for a win, one point for a draw, and no points for a loss. Teams are ranked by total points, with the top six clubs at the end of the season progressing through to the finals.

If points are equal between two or more clubs, goal difference usually determines their placement.

Although when it comes to qualifying for the finals, if the team in sixth and seventh spot are equal on points, then a Repechaje or Playoff is needed to determine which team gains entry into finals.

A system of promotion and relegation exists between the Primera División and the Segunda División.

In May each year, at the conclusion of both the apertura and clausura seasons, the team with the fewest points on aggregate over both seasons, is automatically relegated to the Segunda División, while the team with the second fewest points must participate in a Repechaje or Playoff with the runner-up of the Segunda División.

The winner of this home and away playoff will be guaranteed a spot in the Primera División for the following season.

This means that every year, a maximum of two teams could be relegated from the Primera División depending on the results of the Repechaje between the second last placed team in the Primera División and the runner-up of the Segunda División.

CONCACAF Champions League
La Liga Mayor has two guaranteed spots in the CONCACAF Champions League. One spot in the Preliminary Round and another in the Group stage. The winner of each apertura and clausura season gains automatic entry into this tournament. To determine which team enters the tournament at what stage, aggregate points over both seasons is used, with the team that has the most points overall progressing through to the Group stage, and the other team going to the Preliminary Round. If the same team is to win both the apertura and clausura seasons, then that team automatically gains entry into the Group stage, and again, aggregate points over both seasons is used to determine the second team that will qualify to the Preliminary Round.

History

Foundation
In 1921, the Salvadoran Sports Commission (Comisión Nacional de Educación Física) held its very first National Sports Week. Although initially this event did not include any participation from football clubs, it would go on to be the basis of what would grow to be the Liga Mayor of today. In 1924, due to high demand, the commission included a football tournament in the annual Sports Week. Due to the enormous success of this event, it was decided that starting in 1926 the Sports Week tournament would in turn become the country's official National Football Championship. The championship was to be contended by three teams who represent the three different zones of the country playing in a double round robin format. The first three teams to compete in the tournament were, Nequepio (Central Zone), Chinameca Sporting Club (Eastern Zone) and Olímpic (Western Zone). This format was used until 1930.

Controversy
Controversy occurred after the 1929–30 championship when finalists Excélsior F.C. (who represented the western zone) complained that the second leg of the final against Hércules should not be registered, as they felt that the referee in that game had helped Hércules win the title. The Sports Commission did not agree and the result was not changed. As a result, Excélsior F.C. withdrew from the tournament and Hércules was crowned champion. This led to there being talk of corruption from event organisers against teams from the western part of the country, and as a result teams from that zone refused to take part in any of the following Championships. Because of this there was no national playoff held again until 1937.

Return of the National Championship
The national championship returned to its original format in 1937, but was short lived, as once again, teams complained of there still being corruption within the tournament. Again as a result, there was no national championship during 1939 and 1941. Although no national championship was played, there was still regional championships which over time are now considered to be legitimate national championships.

Introduction of a league format
In 1947 the Salvadoran Football Federation tried to organize a National Championship in league format, but this proved to be unsuccessful and the tournament was suspended after only a few rounds. It proved to be more successful the following season, but was postponed once again in 1949. Although this new format did not begin very well, because of a lack of organisation, it did prove to work very well during the 1950 championship, and throughout the 1950s.

The league begins to form
The 1950s saw interest in the league begin to grow nationwide and although the league did have some problems, with teams dropping out at the end of any given season, it would not affect the league as a whole, as there were various new teams that were anxious to take part in the league and take the place of those that had left. In 1955, league organisers announced that the championship would now be played out in a double round robin format, with a maximum of 10 teams taking part in the league. This year also saw the introduction of promotion and relegation into the league.

Switch to Apertura/Clausura format
In 1998, league officials decided to change the league format from a yearlong tournament to an Apertura/Clausura schedule, with the hope that it would garner more interest in the league and give a chance for its player to rest between seasons.

Annex Major League Soccer El Salvador
These are the three league format that existed in Salvadoran national football league until now

Short Tournament (1926–1946)

Three regional champions, faced each other in the national championship. Each team represented a different section of the country (West zone, Central zone, East zone).

League System (1947–1997)

This format consisted of all against all and twelve national teams participated.

Apertura/Clausura format (1999–present)

The current league format, consisting of two short football tournaments annually mind between opening and closing ceremonies are held.

New league format 2015/2016
For the 2015–16 season, the league will have 12 teams leaving behind 10 team years. With the approval of this new format, major league soccer Cadre El Salvador, seeks to be more competitive and bring football to more people throughout the country.

Primera Division clubs
The following 12 teams are competing in the 2022–23 Primera División season.

Sponsorship
ON January 2023, league president Pedro David Hernández announced Instituto Nacional de los Deportes de El Salvador INDES as the official sponsor, with the goal of modernizing the league's image. The contract was signed for seven years worth estimated 9 million dollars

Since 2021, Pioneer Deportes has been the official match ball manufacturer. In 2021, the contract was extended for three years concluding until 2024.

Team presidents

Important matches 
 FAS vs Águila "Clásico Nacional"
 FAS vs Isidro Metapán "Derbi Santaneco"
 Águila vs Firpo "Derbi de Oriente"
 Alianza vs Atlético Marte "Derbi Capitalino"
 FAS vs Firpo "Clasico de los 90s"
 Dragón vs Águila  " Derbi Migueleño"
 Jocoro vs Fuerte San Francisco  " Derbi Morazeño"
 Municipal Limeño vs Pasaquina  " Derbi Cuchero"

International broadcasters

Centro y Norte America (CNA)

Champions

Teams in bold are currently participating in La Liga Mayor.
 (#) – Current Primera Division Champion (†) – Defunct national team

Former teams

Player records (Liga Mayor de Futbol)
Statistics below are for all-time leaders who are still playing. Statistics are for regular season only.

Short Tournament (1926–1946)
Three regional champions, faced each other in the national championship. Each team represented a different section of the country (West zone, Central zone, East zone).

* – There was no national championship held during this year, only regional championships. These championships are now often considered national titles.

League System (1947–1997)

** – No national championship was held during these years

Apertura/Clausura format (1999–present)

(*) The first winner of the shorter tournament has been deemed "Champion Cup", and the next, that of the Clausura 1999, as "champions". The First Division of El Salvador has not changed that status competition.

(^) Season was suspended due to the COVID-19 pandemic. Once Deportivo were originally given the championship after leading the competition after 11 rounds, but the title was later retracted.

Professional Football locally Salvadoran

Personnel

Current Board of Directors

Management

References

External links 
 La Prensa Grafica coverage 
 El Grafico League coverage 
 Salvadoran clubs kit info
 Largest wins in Salvadoran football History article 
 El Salvador – List of Champions, RSSSF.com

 
1
El Salvador
Sports leagues established in 1969
1969 establishments in El Salvador